Church of the Mediator may refer to:

Church of the Mediator (Micanopy, Florida)
 Episcopal Church of the Mediator (Bronx, New York)